Mehmet Budak (born August 1, 1980 in Doğanşehir, Turkey) is a Turkish footballer. He last played as a winger for 68 Yeni Aksarayspor.

Club career
Budak previously played for Adanaspor and Malatyaspor in the Super Lig, and Eskişehirspor and Sakaryaspor in the TFF First League.

References

1980 births
Living people
Turkish footballers
Turkey B international footballers
Eskişehirspor footballers
Adanaspor footballers
Malatyaspor footballers
Sakaryaspor footballers
Altay S.K. footballers

Association football midfielders